Anchuelo is a municipality in the autonomous community of the Community of Madrid in central Spain. It belongs to the comarca of Alcalá.

References

External links 
 

Municipalities in the Community of Madrid